Emamzadeh Esmail (also Romanized as Emāmzādeh Esmā‘īl and Emāmzādeh-ye Esmā‘īl) is a village in Lishtar Rural District, in the Central District of Gachsaran County, Kohgiluyeh and Boyer-Ahmad Province, Iran. At the 2006 census, its population was 22, in 6 families.

References 

Populated places in Gachsaran County